Hapsford is a former civil parish, now in the parishes of Dunham-on-the-Hill and Hapsford and Manley, in Cheshire West and Chester, England. It contains three buildings that are recorded in the National Heritage List for England as designated listed buildings, all of which are at Grade II. This grade is the lowest of the three gradings given to listed buildings and is applied to "buildings of national importance and special interest". Apart from he village of Hapsford, the parish is entirely rural. All the listed buildings are domestic, or related to farming.

See also
Listed buildings in Alvanley
Listed buildings in Barrow
Listed buildings in Dunham-on-the-Hill
Listed buildings in Elton
Listed buildings in Helsby
Listed buildings in Manley
Listed buildings in Mickle Trafford
Listed buildings in Thornton-le-Moors

References
Citations

Sources

Listed buildings in Cheshire West and Chester
Lists of listed buildings in Cheshire